Society for Protection of the Harbour (SPH) is a Hong-Kong-based organisation founded in November 1995. It is a charitable, non-political and non-profit making green group. The objectives of the organisation are to protect the Victoria Harbour in Hong Kong from destruction caused by Government's excessive reclamation and improper development, and to arouse public aspirations for the Harbour. To preserve the Harbour, SPH has raised a number of objections on related Government policies, undertaken numerous conservation projects, suggested constructive urban planning along the waterfront and carried out public education on harbour protection.

Background
There has historically been reclamation of Victoria Harbour since the early part of the 20th century. Since the 1989, when the Government had completed its feasibility study, and launched the Central and Wan Chai Reclamation project, there has been growing realisation on the part of the general public of the deterioration of the environment and the encroachment upon the beautiful natural harbour Hong Kong once had, lost to urban and real estate development.

Concerns about possible impacts of harbour reclamation 
 Strategic Planning: Harbour reclamation may isolate Hong Kong from the Pearl River Delta hinterland, setting back economic activities.
 Harbour Safety: The narrowing of the Harbour may create a less favourable environment for navigation and other water activities as water currents become much stronger and space for manoeuvring is reduced.
 Landscape Destruction and Loss of Habitat: Harbour reclamation may result in a permanent destruction of Hong Kong's irreplaceable natural asset, Victoria Harbour. The loss of natural coastlines might result in the loss of natural habitats and shallowing feeding areas for many inter-tidal creatures that live in shallow sandy bays or on rocky shorelines.
 Air and Water Pollution: Intensive development of the reclaimed areas may worsen air quality in the nearby urban area. Moreover, reclamation worsens the water quality of the harbour, thus adversely affecting marine life.
 Flushing Action: Reclamation may narrow the Harbour and potentially creates "dead spots" where there is little flushing tidal action, and where litter and sewage could accumulate.

History
The Society was established in 1995

Inspired by his mother to preserve the Victoria Harbour, Winston Chu Ka Sun (徐嘉慎) founded the SPH in 1995. Chairman of the local chapter of Friends of the Earth, Christine Loh (陸恭蕙) became Deputy Chairperson. Jennifer Chow (周潔冰) and Honorary Secretary.

On 11 October 2003, Winston Chu announced his resignation as Chairperson of SPH due to death threats against him and his family. To fill the void left by Chu, Christine Loh stepped in as the new Chairperson of SPH. Chu nevertheless continues to provide legal advice and other support to SPH.

Significant events

1996 
In 1996, the Society for Protection of the Harbour conducted the "Save Our Harbour" Campaign which received support of 170,000 signatures from the Hong Kong public. The same year in May, SPH succeeded in opposing the Government's proposal of reclaiming 190 hectares (20.5 million square feet) of Green Island (青洲).The Protection of the Harbour Bill (海港保護條例草案) to the Legislative Council (立法會) as a private members' bill in June and sent a Petition to the Governor-in-Council Chris Patten (彭定康) was also produced which was supported by 148,041 signatures from the public in December.

1997 
In April 1997, SPH appointed Dr. Robert Chung (鍾庭耀博士) of the Social Sciences Research Centre of The University of Hong Kong (香港大學社會科學研究中心) to conduct an opinion survey on harbour reclamation. The result showed that over 95% of Hong Kong people opposed further reclamation on the Harbour. In June, the Protection of the Harbour Ordinance was legislated.

The Protection of the Harbour Ordinance (保護海港條例)
Proposed as a private member's bill by Christine Loh in 1996 and enacted on 30 June 1997, the Ordinance was established as a presumption against reclamation in the Central Harbour. In 1999, further amendment of the Ordinance extended its coverage from Central Harbour to the entire Victoria Harbour. The aim of the Ordinance is to protect and preserve the Harbour as a special public asset and a natural heritage of Hong Kong.

The full text of the Protection of the Harbour Ordinance

1998 
The Government's proposals of reclaiming 340 hectares (36.5 million square feet) of Kowloon Bay (九龍灣) and 32 hectares (3.5 million square feet) of the Central Waterfront at Tamar Site (天馬艦) were successfully pulled down by SPH in January and May respectively.

1999 
In October 1999, the former Chief Executive, Tung Chee Hwa (董建華), under the persuasion of SPH, promised in his 1999 Policy Address to downsize the reclamation plan for the Harbour and to follow the Principle of Sustainable Development as a major concern of the public. In addition, he claimed in a public radio conversation with Winston Chu that "the government will try to reduce reclamation to an absolute minimum". In December, the proposal of reclaiming a part of North Point(北角) waterfront for a cruise centre was successfully halted by SPH.

2000 
In March 2000 the Town Planning Board (城市規劃委員會) under the persuasion of SPH, announced in its Vision Statement for Victoria Harbour: "The Harbour is to be protected and preserved as a special public asset and a natural heritage of the people of Hong Kong. Reclamation in the Harbour should only be carried out to meet essential community needs and public aspirations."

2001 
In June 2001, SPH successfully stopped the Government's project of reclaiming 79 hectares (8.5 million square feet) of the Western District waterfront.

2002–2003 
During 2002–2003, SPH succeeded in applying for Judicial Review against the Town Planning Board. The Government's proposal of reclaiming 26 hectares (2.9 million square feet) of the Wanchai waterfront was again opposed. On 5 October 2003, SPH conducted "The Blue Ribbon Campaign"  in which around 3,000 supporters joined.
And hundreds of people signed a petition in "Signature Campaign" on 12 October 2003. In the same year, approximately 1000 protesters marched to the government buildings in Central to demand a halt of reclamation work on the Harbour.

2004 
In January 2004, the interpretation of the Protection of the Harbour Ordinance suggested by the High Court (Hong Kong) (高等法院) Judgment of Madam Justice Chu (朱芬齡) was approved by The Court of Final Appeal (終審法院,CFA).

Moreover, SPH urged the Government to halt all reclamation works in Central Reclamation Phase III (CR3)  and asked the Town Planning Board to conduct a proper review of the plans with regards to the criteria of the judgment proposed.

In March, SPH held the "Hand-in-Hand" Rally in which over 10,000 people formed a "human chain" along the Harbour from Central to Wan Chai to demonstrate against harbour reclamation.

In July, SPH joined Save Our Shorelines (SOS) and Clear the Air (CTA) to urge the governor to maintain good governance and transparent and fair town planning process. In September, SPH conducted a "Vote for the Harbour" Campaign. To include the protection of the Harbour in the election platform, SPH asked its supporters and the Hong Kong public to give their vote for the Harbour, and contacted all the candidates and political parties in the Legislative Council of Hong Kong to support it. As a result, 86% candidates supported harbour protection and preservation.see results.
The story book "The Adventures of Victoria" was published to arouse harbour protection awareness and complaints from the Government was received because of this publication. In response to the complaint, SPH had written a letter to Donald Tsang (曾蔭權), Michael Suen (孫明揚) and Dr. Robert Chung (鍾庭耀博士).

2005 
From April to May, SPH held two public campaign; the "Kids Love the Harbour Campaign" (好孩子．愛香港) and the "Giordano selling Saving Victoria T-shirt" for teenagers. In September "Victoria Harbour and I" Photo Competition was held.

In May, SPH together with Save Our Shorelines (SOS) and Clear the Air (CTA) held a Joint Press Release and presented a join petition to the Town Planning Board.

In November, the Action Group on Protection of the Harbour and Friends of the Harbour (FOTH) joined together for the first time to launch the "HARBOUR WEEK" (保護維港週) from 6th to 13th. On 13 November, SPH, Action Group on Protection of the Harbour and FOTH launched a Harbour Week Carnival (保護維港週嘉年華) at the Golden Bauhinia Square, Wanchai, to encourage people to appreciate and care for the Victoria Harbour. 

On 17 December, another Joint Press Release titled "CIVIL SOCIETY DECLARES VICTORY—STOP and RETHINK: No Rush for the Tamar Site!” was published.

2006 
On 1 January, SPH has moved its headquarters from Central to Mr. Winston Chu's law firm in Admiralty. Moreover, she has reduced the number of staff, from two full-time officers to only one part-time worker. While the move has been viewed by other harbour advisers as a retreat in the SPH's operations following the Government's commitment not to reclaim the Victoria Harbour after the legal battle. Ms. Christine Loh, chairperson of SPH, said "By saving on rent, staff and other utilities, we will have more resources for campaigning. It is going to be a long and winding road."

In January, SPH appointed The University of Hong Kong to conduct a public opinion survey --"Planning for West Kowloon and the Harbour-front" which showed that the public rejected the developmental proposal of West Kowloon Cultural District.

In April, SPH and other associations organised a 'Tamar Day' to raise the public awareness of the impact of the construction in Tamar. The SPH continues to hold Press Conference in 2006. One was on 1 June 2006, Mr. Simon F.S. Li (李福善) voiced the public message regarding the proposed Government headquarters on Tamar. Another one was held on 1 July 2006 outside the Hong Kong Central Library to demonstrate the Society's concern and commitment to the "Protection of the Harbour" and the "Enhancement of the Harbourfront".

Parts of harbour SPH has saved

Recent actions
The recent action of the Society for Protection of the Harbour is related to the harbour reclamation in the Central and Wan Chai Districts. According to the Government, this project is needed for solving traffic problems, and the reclaimed land will be used for commercial development in future.
Therefore, SPH is now encouraging Hong Kong citizens to request the Government to review its present policy of extensive development of the above two mentioned districts.
There is also a reply slip available from SPH's website. The organisation encourages citizens to download it and write down their own opinions.

Harbour Carnival and Walk for the Harbour

On 12 November 2006, the Society For Protection of the Harbour, together with Friends of the Harbour, Action Group on Protection of the Harbour (保護維港行動), and United Social Service Centre (安榮社會服務中心) will hold the Harbour Carnival & Walk for the Harbour. The objective of the event is to encourage the public to appreciate and to pay attention to the Victoria Harbour. The Harbour Carnival Walk will set off from the Edinburgh Place along the coastline to the Wan Chai Golden Bauhinia Square, taking approximately half an hour. The Harbour Carnival and Cruises will be held after the Walk.

Suggestion on urban planning along the waterfront
To avoid the Victoria Harbour being destroyed by inappropriate development, Society for Protection of the Harbour suggests the constructive urban planning along the waterfront.
 
 2004
Proposals to Amend the Central District Outline Zoning Plan

 2003
 Society for Protection of the Harbour's suggestion(1)- urban planning for the Harbour Front of Central and Wan Chai area
 Society for Protection of the Harbour's suggestion(2)- urban planning for the Harbour Front of Central and Wan Chai area

Awards
 2005
Clearwater Award 2005, an international accolade presented by USA-based The Waterfront Center , an international waterfront concern group. The Clearwater Award recognises outstanding efforts by individuals or non-profit citizen's organisations to better their community and harbour's waterfront. The Society of the Protection of the Harbour was presented this Award in recognition for its work in protecting the Victoria Harbour of Hong Kong.

External links

News articles

In English
In chronological order, the latest on top.

 14 August 2006 Courts protest our imperiled waterway-at least for the time being(The Standard)
 11 Feb 2006 Legco warning on hub decision (SCMP)
 10 Feb 2006 Show all on plans for HQ, government told (SCMP)
 7 Feb 2006 Officials 'dishonest over Tamar site' (SCMP)
 6 Feb 2006 Look again at options for government offices (SCMP)
 23 January 2006 Activists gearing up for action on Tamar (SCMP)
 14 November 2005 5,000 put up strong show for Harbour Week carnival (The Standard)
 25 July 2005 Coalition calls for tough strategy to protect harbour (The Standard)
 3 Jul 2005 Reclamation fight turns to new CE (The Standard)
 29 June 2005 Renewed Wan Chai bypass bid attacked (The Standard)
 19 May 2005 Lobbyists say their views were ignored (The Standard)
 6 Apr 2005 Toll hike a reclamation ruse: Loh (The Standard)
 3 Jan 2005 Harbor group raps authorities for not listening (The Standard)
 2 Jan 2005 Reclamation work for bypass ' not needed'(The Standard)

Note: "SCMP"=South China Morning Post, an English newspaper in Hong Kong

In Chinese
In chronological order, the latest on top.

 4 Sep 2006 馬傑偉﹕香港城市意識抬頭 (星島日報)
 13 July 2006 立法會否決保護維港動議 (星島日報)
 11 Jul 2006 郭家麒倡設獨立海港管理局 保護維港取經澳洲 (明報)
 11 Jul 2006 設海港管理局今辯論 (東方日報)
 22 June 2006 曾蔭權被批親疏有別 去民建聯黨慶 不見反對團體 (明報)
 20 June 2006 七成人促新政府總部工程延長諮詢 (東方日報)
 7 Jun 2006 公民黨倡添馬艦再諮詢 促政府延遲申撥款 民主黨未和議 (明報)
 19 May 2006 保護維港行動 反對填海方案 (明報)
 30 April 2006 公民黨添馬新建議爭支持 (星島日報)
 28 April 2006 添馬艦放風箏 爭取藍天白雲 (明報)

Other related articles
 Central Harbourfront: Over  of additional floor space Author: Ms. Christine Loh
 Why we say the Victoria Harbour is an irreplaceable and irrecoverable special asset as well as a natural heritage of the Hong Kong people? Author: Richard Yu
 Civic Responsibility Author: John Bowden
 The Environmental Impact of Harbour Reclamation Author: Lisa Hopkinson
 The History of Victoria Harbour Author: Stephen Brown
 Harbour Becomes a River, Brings Misfortunes to Our Next Generation Author: Mr. So Man Fung
 How to Lose a Harbour Author: Time Magazine Chaim Estulin

References

 Website of Society for Protection of the Harbour
 Website of Friends of The Harbour http://www.friendsoftheharbour.org/
 Town Planning Board: Planning for victoria Harbour http://www.info.gov.hk/tpb/
 South China Morning Post (南華早報)
 The Standard (英文虎報)
 Sing Tao Daily(星島日報)
 Ming Pao (明報)
 Oriental Daily (東方日報)

1995 establishments in Hong Kong
Environmental organisations based in Hong Kong
Victoria Harbour